The Craniidae are a family of brachiopods, commonly known as lamp shells. Although it belongs to a subdivision called the inarticulata which have shells where the mineral content consist of calcium phosphate, the Craniidae have shells that consist of calcium carbonate. Other special characteristics of this family are that no outgrowths are developed to form a hinge between both valves, nor is there any support for the lophophore. As adults, craniids either lived free on the ocean floor or, more commonly, were attached to a hard object with all or part of the ventral valve. In craniids, a pedicle is not known from any development stage.

They are the only members of the order Craniida and the monotypic suborder Craniidina and superfamily Cranioidea; consequently, the latter two taxa are presently redundant and not used very often. Valdiviathyris and Neoancistrocrania were sometimes separated in a family Valdiviathyrididae but this has turned out to be unjustified.

Most Craniidae are long extinct forms known only from fossils like all other Craniforma. However, some 20 species of this 470-million-year-old lineage are surviving today. They include Valdiviathyris quenstedti which has remained essentially unchanged for the last 35 million years or so. Although some minimal evolution would obviously have taken place in the meantime, this was essentially silent mutations and marginal adaptations to cooler habitat. Present-day Valdiviathyris are all but inseparable from those of the Late Eocene and the genus cannot even be divided into chronospecies. Thus, V. quenstedti is a true living fossil and one of the oldest and most long-lived species known to science.

Gallery

References 

Brachiopod families
Extant Ordovician first appearances
Craniata